is a 2010 Japanese film by Mipo Oh. It was released in Japanese cinemas on 4 September 2010.

Plot
A single mother comes home to her single child and is accompanied by an unannounced, much younger man. Her daughter Tsukiko thinks in the first place her mother intends to pair her off with this stranger, but her mother wants the unemployed chef for herself. Tsukiko, who is unemployed herself, has it hard to somehow cope with this development.

Cast
 Aoi Miyazaki as Tsukiko Morii
 Shinobu Otake as Yoko Morii
 Kenta Kiritani as Kenji Hattori
 Moeko Ezawa as Saku Ueno
 Jun Kunimura as Akira Murakami
 Yasufumi Hayashi as Shinya Motohashi
  as Yoshio Sasaki
 Yasuko Haru as Sachi Shimamura
 Seiko Takuma as Makoto Wada
 Tomochika as Seiko Kotani
 Toshiki Ayata as Ryoji Inosena

References

External links
  
 Kinejun cinema 
 allcinema 
 Kadokawa Pictures 
 

2010 films
Toei Company films
2010s Japanese films